Liberman Bryan Torres Nazareno (born 16 May 2002) is an Ecuadorian footballer who plays as a defensive midfielder for Spanish club Villarreal B.

Club career

Independiente del Valle
After already featuring with the reserve team Independiente Juniors in the Serie B, he made his first team debut on 3 October 2020, coming on as a late substitute for Christian Ortiz in a 3–1 Serie A away win over Orense.

On 25 August 2022, Torres terminated his contract with del Valle.

Villarreal
On 26 August 2022, Villarreal announced the signing of Torres, with the player being initially assigned to the B-team in Segunda División. He made his debut for the B-side on 17 September, replacing Adrián de la Fuente in a 3–1 home win over CD Lugo.

References

External links

2002 births
Living people
Ecuadorian footballers
Association football midfielders
Ecuadorian Serie A players
C.S.D. Independiente del Valle footballers
Segunda División players
Villarreal CF B players
Ecuadorian expatriate footballers
Ecuadorian expatriate sportspeople in Spain
Expatriate footballers in Spain